Elections to Liverpool Town Council were held on Tuesday 2 November 1836. One third of the council seats were up for election, the term of office of each councillor being three years.

All of the sixteen wards were contested.

After the election, the composition of the council was:

Election result

Ward results

* - Retiring Councillor seeking re-election

Abercromby

Castle Street

Everton

Exchange

Great George

Lime Street

North Toxteth

Pitt Street

Rodney Street

St. Anne Street

St. Paul's

St. Peter's

Scotland

South Toxteth

Vauxhall

West Derby

See also

Liverpool City Council

Liverpool Town Council elections 1835 - 1879

Liverpool City Council elections 1880–present

Mayors and Lord Mayors 
of Liverpool 1207 to present

History of local government in England

References

1836
1836 English local elections
November 1836 events
1830s in Liverpool